Syrnola thomensis is a species of sea snail, a marine gastropod mollusk in the family Pyramidellidae, the pyrams and their allies.

It occurs in the Atlantic Ocean off São Tomé, Príncipe, Congo and Guinea.

References

Pyramidellidae
Invertebrates of Africa
Gastropods described in 1915